Presidential elections were held in the breakaway republic of Transnistria on 9 December 2001. The result was a victory for incumbent President Igor Smirnov, who received 82% of the vote. The other candidates were Tom Zenovich, mayor of Bender (the second largest city in the country), and Alexander Radchenko of the Power to the People party, which advocated reunion with Moldova.

Results

References

2001 elections in Moldova
Elections in Transnistria
2001 in Transnistria
December 2001 events in Asia